Palais des Sports de Treichville is an indoor sporting arena located in Treichville, Abidjan, Ivory Coast.  The capacity of the arena is 3,500 people.

External links
Venue information

Indoor arenas in Ivory Coast
Sport in Abidjan
Handball venues in Ivory Coast
Basketball venues in Ivory Coast
Volleyball venues in Ivory Coast
Boxing venues in Ivory Coast
Badminton venues